I Am is a 2010 faith-based, non-linear, drama film written and directed by John Ward, produced by John Ward, Chris Marcus, and professional baseball veteran Todd Zeile, through Bay Ridge Films and Upper Room Media and released by 20th Century Fox.  Co-produced by Stefan Hajek and Aaron Breeden, and shot and edited by Chris Marcus, the film stars Tomas Boykin, Jay Hindle, Todd Zeile, John Ward, Greg Fisk, Amy Holland, Christinna Chauncey, and Stefan Hajek. On October 10, 2010, the film had a limited release in 2,500 churches worldwide in preparation for its DVD release of November 2, 2010.

Background
Documenting 10 people and their failure to follow the 10 commandments, the project was in production for 18 months. I Am is a series of modern-day lessons from the Ten Commandments and was produced from a minimal budget by the creators and producers of the 'Liquid Series' in Los Angeles, Newport Beach, and Irvine, California, over various shooting days in 2008 and 2009.  The feature film has been often described as a "Christian Crash" both by Hollywood executives and Christian pastors.

Cast 

 Tomas Boykin as I Am
 Jay Hindle as Lance Vita
 John Ward as Aaron Rossdale
 Todd Zeile as Trevor Evans
 Stefan Hajek as Jake Russell
 Amy Holland as Alice Bordeaux
 Kate Bishop as Elaine
 Greg Fisk as Dr. Ortus
 Christinna Chauncey as Angelica Vita
 Gary Edward as Selani
 Laura McHenry as Eva
 Josie Gammell as Lt. Everett
 Clay Randall as Spenser Hamilton
 Rosalie Autumn Miller as Liz
 Garrett Zeile as Will Evans
 Courtney Duckworth as Sarah Russell
 Ace Marrero as Officer Allegro
 Rosalie Autumn Miller as Liz
 Marijana Pecijarevska as Selani's Girlfriend
 Clay Randal as Spenser Hamilton
 Erin Stegeman as Dr. Carmichael

Production and marketing 
I Am was created and produced by the same team that created the Liquid DVD series, and was shot with the support of, and in cooperation with, Mariners Church in Irvine, California.  Many locations were donated as were the talents of many team members.  As an alternative to a traditional theatrical release, the producers and distributors opted instead to release the film as a world premiere screening across North America in 1,500 churches before release to the general public.

Music 
The film soundtrack for I Am features songs by both Christian and secular groups and artists, such as Katharine McPhee, Michael Johns, John Driskell Hopkins (of Zac Brown Band), Rasa 9, and Travis Ryan.  Original score for the film was composed and produced by Christian Lundberg.  Music supervisor was Stefan Hajek.

 "Salvation is Here" - Travis Ryan
 "Fools Gold" - Michael Johns
 "Say Goodbye" - Katharine McPhee
 "Free” - Tim Timmons
 "Don’t Run Away” - Tim Timmons
 "Facedown" - Sandfrog
 "Save Yourself" - Sandfrog
 "Cool As We" - Stickfigure
 "Lazy Man" - John Driskell Hopkins
 "Girl" - Joel Eckels and Paper Sun
 "Bittersweet Illusion" - JetStream
 "Halfway to Happiness" - JetStream
 "On and On" - JetStream
 "I Am" - Jessica Specht
 "Say Goodbye" - Rasa 9

A music video for the song, "Say Goodbye," by Katharine McPhee, features footage from the film.

References

External links
 
 
 Liquid Video Series

2010 films
20th Century Fox films
2010 drama films
2010s English-language films
American independent films
Ten Commandments
Films set in Los Angeles
Films shot in Los Angeles
2010 independent films
2010s American films